The Palindromist is a magazine devoted to palindromes, published since 1996. Initially it was published biannually. The frequency switched to irregular. It is edited by Mark Saltveit, a Portland-based stand-up comedian who won the first-ever World Palindrome Championship.

Each issue of the magazine prints a variety of palindromes in various forms (letter-unit, word-unit, and vertical), covers palindrome-related news, and seeks to accredit writers of famous palindromes.  The magazine also covers closely related forms of wordplay, including calculator words and written charades.

The magazine organizes the SymmyS Awards, an annual palindrome competition adjudicated by a celebrity panel.  Past judges have included Will Shortz, MC Paul Barman, Ben Zimmer, David Allen Cress, "Weird Al" Yankovic, Demetri Martin, and John Flansburgh.

See also
Word Ways: The Journal of Recreational Linguistics

References

External links

The SymmyS Awards

1996 establishments in Oregon
Biannual magazines published in the United States
English-language magazines
Game magazines
Literary magazines published in the United States
Magazines established in 1996
Magazines published in Portland, Oregon
Palindromes
Word games
Irregularly published magazines published in the United States